Vesyoly (masculine), Vesyolaya (feminine), or Vesyoloye (neuter) is the name of several rural localities in Russia:

Republic of Adygea
As of 2010, four rural localities in the Republic of Adygea bear this name:
Vesyoly, Maykop, Republic of Adygea, a khutor under the administrative jurisdiction of Maykop Republican Urban Okrug
Vesyoly (Abadzekhskoye Rural Settlement), Maykopsky District, Republic of Adygea, a khutor in Maykopsky District; municipally, a part of Abadzekhskoye Rural Settlement of that district
Vesyoly (Kamennomostskoye Rural Settlement), Maykopsky District, Republic of Adygea, a khutor in Maykopsky District; municipally, a part of Kamennomostskoye Rural Settlement of that district
Vesyoly, Shovgenovsky District, Republic of Adygea, a khutor in Shovgenovsky District

Altai Krai
As of 2010, one rural locality in Altai Krai bears this name:
Vesyoloye, Altai Krai, a selo under the administrative jurisdiction of the town of krai significance of Slavgorod

Amur Oblast
As of 2010, one rural locality in Amur Oblast bears this name:
Vesyoloye, Amur Oblast, a selo in Arginsky Rural Settlement of Seryshevsky District

Republic of Bashkortostan
As of 2010, two rural localities in the Republic of Bashkortostan bear this name:
Vesyoly, Iglinsky District, Republic of Bashkortostan, a village in Krasnovoskhodsky Selsoviet of Iglinsky District
Vesyoly, Sterlitamaksky District, Republic of Bashkortostan, a village in Oktyabrsky Selsoviet of Sterlitamaksky District

Belgorod Oblast
As of 2010, eight rural localities in Belgorod Oblast bear this name:
Vesyoly, Gubkinsky District, Belgorod Oblast, a khutor in Gubkinsky District
Vesyoly, Korochansky District, Belgorod Oblast, a khutor in Korochansky District
Vesyoly, Krasnensky District, Belgorod Oblast, a khutor in Raskhovetsky Rural Okrug of Krasnensky District
Vesyoly, Novooskolsky District, Belgorod Oblast, a khutor in Novooskolsky District
Vesyoly, Prokhorovsky District, Belgorod Oblast, a khutor in Prokhorovsky District
Vesyoly, Veydelevsky District, Belgorod Oblast, a khutor in Veydelevsky District
Vesyoly, Yakovlevsky District, Belgorod Oblast, a khutor in Yakovlevsky District
Vesyoloye, Belgorod Oblast, a selo in Krasnogvardeysky District

Bryansk Oblast
As of 2010, three rural localities in Bryansk Oblast bear this name:
Vesyoly, Bryansky District, Bryansk Oblast, a settlement in Novodarkovichsky Selsoviet of Bryansky District
Vesyoly, Dushatinsky Selsoviet, Surazhsky District, Bryansk Oblast, a settlement in Dushatinsky Selsoviet of Surazhsky District
Vesyoly, Lopaznensky Selsoviet, Surazhsky District, Bryansk Oblast, a settlement in Lopaznensky Selsoviet of Surazhsky District

Irkutsk Oblast
As of 2010, one rural locality in Irkutsk Oblast bears this name:
Vesyoly, Irkutsk Oblast, a settlement in Chunsky District

Kaliningrad Oblast
As of 2010, one rural locality in Kaliningrad Oblast bears this name:
Vesyoly, Kaliningrad Oblast, a settlement in Ozerkovsky Rural Okrug of Gvardeysky District

Republic of Kalmykia
As of 2010, two rural localities in the Republic of Kalmykia bear this name:
Vesyoloye, Gorodovikovsky District, Republic of Kalmykia, a selo in Druzhnenskaya Rural Administration of Gorodovikovsky District
Vesyoloye, Yashaltinsky District, Republic of Kalmykia, a selo in Veselovskaya Rural Administration of Yashaltinsky District

Kemerovo Oblast
As of 2010, one rural locality in Kemerovo Oblast bears this name:
Vesyoly, Kemerovo Oblast, a settlement in Krasulinskaya Rural Territory of Novokuznetsky District

Khabarovsk Krai
As of 2010, one rural locality in Khabarovsk Krai bears this name:
Vesyoly, Khabarovsk Krai, a settlement in Verkhnebureinsky District

Krasnodar Krai
As of 2010, eighteen rural localities in Krasnodar Krai bear this name:
Vesyoly, Goryachy Klyuch, Krasnodar Krai, a khutor in Kutaissky Rural Okrug of the Town of Goryachy Klyuch
Vesyoly, Kanevskoy District, Krasnodar Krai, a settlement in Chelbassky Rural Okrug of Kanevskoy District
Vesyoly, Keslerovsky Rural Okrug, Krymsky District, Krasnodar Krai, a khutor in Keslerovsky Rural Okrug of Krymsky District
Vesyoly, Merchansky Rural Okrug, Krymsky District, Krasnodar Krai, a khutor in Merchansky Rural Okrug of Krymsky District
Vesyoly, Yuzhny Rural Okrug, Krymsky District, Krasnodar Krai, a khutor in Yuzhny Rural Okrug of Krymsky District
Vesyoly, Kurganinsky District, Krasnodar Krai, a settlement in Mikhaylovsky Rural Okrug of Kurganinsky District
Vesyoly, Voznesensky Rural Okrug, Labinsky District, Krasnodar Krai, a settlement in Voznesensky Rural Okrug of Labinsky District
Vesyoly, Zassovsky Rural Okrug, Labinsky District, Krasnodar Krai, a khutor in Zassovsky Rural Okrug of Labinsky District
Vesyoly, Mostovsky District, Krasnodar Krai, a khutor in Mostovskoy Settlement Okrug of Mostovsky District
Vesyoly, Novokubansky District, Krasnodar Krai, a settlement in Prikubansky Rural Okrug of Novokubansky District
Vesyoly, Krasnogvardeysky Rural Okrug, Otradnensky District, Krasnodar Krai, a khutor in Krasnogvardeysky Rural Okrug of Otradnensky District
Vesyoly, Mayaksky Rural Okrug, Otradnensky District, Krasnodar Krai, a settlement in Mayaksky Rural Okrug of Otradnensky District
Vesyoly, Seversky District, Krasnodar Krai, a khutor in Chernomorsky Settlement Okrug of Seversky District
Vesyoly, Starominsky District, Krasnodar Krai, a khutor in Kuybyshevsky Rural Okrug of Starominsky District
Vesyoly, Tbilissky District, Krasnodar Krai, a khutor in Vannovsky Rural Okrug of Tbilissky District
Vesyoly, Uspensky District, Krasnodar Krai, a khutor in Veselovsky Rural Okrug of Uspensky District
Vesyoloye, Krasnodar Krai, a selo in Nizhneshilovsky Rural Okrug of the City of Sochi
Vesyolaya, Krasnodar Krai, a stanitsa in Veselovsky Stanitsa Okrug of Pavlovsky District

Krasnoyarsk Krai
As of 2010, one rural locality in Krasnoyarsk Krai bears this name:
Vesyoloye, Krasnoyarsk Krai, a selo in Veselovsky Selsoviet of Taseyevsky District

Kursk Oblast
As of 2010, six rural localities in Kursk Oblast bear this name:
Vesyoly, Bolshesoldatsky District, Kursk Oblast, a settlement in Lyubostansky Selsoviet of Bolshesoldatsky District
Vesyoly, Soldatsky Selsoviet, Fatezhsky District, Kursk Oblast, a khutor in Soldatsky Selsoviet of Fatezhsky District
Vesyoly, Verkhnekhotemlsky Selsoviet, Fatezhsky District, Kursk Oblast, a khutor in Verkhnekhotemlsky Selsoviet of Fatezhsky District
Vesyoly, Khomutovsky District, Kursk Oblast, a settlement in Menshikovsky Selsoviet of Khomutovsky District
Vesyoly, Zheleznogorsky District, Kursk Oblast, a khutor in Linetsky Selsoviet of Zheleznogorsky District
Vesyoloye, Kursk Oblast, a selo in Veselovsky Selsoviet of Glushkovsky District

Lipetsk Oblast
As of 2010, two rural localities in Lipetsk Oblast bear this name:
Vesyoloye, Lipetsk Oblast, a village in Rogozhinsky Selsoviet of Zadonsky District
Vesyolaya, Lipetsk Oblast, a village in Veselovsky Selsoviet of Dolgorukovsky District

Republic of Mordovia
As of 2010, one rural locality in the Republic of Mordovia bears this name:
Vesyoly, Republic of Mordovia, a settlement in Lavrentyevsky Selsoviet of Temnikovsky District

Republic of North Ossetia–Alania
As of 2010, one rural locality in the Republic of North Ossetia–Alania bears this name:
Vesyoloye, Republic of North Ossetia–Alania, a selo in Veselovsky Rural Okrug of Mozdoksky District

Novosibirsk Oblast
As of 2010, one rural locality in Novosibirsk Oblast bears this name:
Vesyolaya, Novosibirsk Oblast, a village in Severny District

Omsk Oblast
As of 2010, two rural localities in Omsk Oblast bear this name:
Vesyoly, Gorkovsky District, Omsk Oblast, a settlement in Astyrovsky Rural Okrug of Gorkovsky District
Vesyoly, Moskalensky District, Omsk Oblast, a settlement in Zvezdinsky Rural Okrug of Moskalensky District

Oryol Oblast
As of 2010, five rural localities in Oryol Oblast bear this name:
Vesyoly, Glazunovsky District, Oryol Oblast, a settlement in Taginsky Selsoviet of Glazunovsky District
Vesyoly, Kolpnyansky District, Oryol Oblast, a settlement in Znamensky Selsoviet of Kolpnyansky District
Vesyoly, Soskovsky District, Oryol Oblast, a settlement in Almazovsky Selsoviet of Soskovsky District
Vesyoly, Zalegoshchensky District, Oryol Oblast, a settlement in Lomovsky Selsoviet of Zalegoshchensky District
Vesyolaya, Oryol Oblast, a village in Grachevsky Selsoviet of Zalegoshchensky District

Penza Oblast
As of 2010, two rural localities in Penza Oblast bear this name:
Vesyoly, Penza Oblast, a settlement in Volchkovsky Selsoviet of Belinsky District
Vesyolaya, Penza Oblast, a village in Yursovsky Selsoviet of Zemetchinsky District

Primorsky Krai
As of 2010, one rural locality in Primorsky Krai bears this name:
Vesyoly, Primorsky Krai, a settlement in Anuchinsky District

Rostov Oblast
As of 2010, eleven rural localities in Rostov Oblast bear this name:
Vesyoly, Aksaysky District, Rostov Oblast, a khutor in Grushevskoye Rural Settlement of Aksaysky District
Vesyoly, Dubovsky District, Rostov Oblast, a khutor in Veselovskoye Rural Settlement of Dubovsky District
Vesyoly, Martynovsky District, Rostov Oblast, a khutor in Ilyinovskoye Rural Settlement of Martynovsky District
Vesyoly, Myasnikovsky District, Rostov Oblast, a khutor in Nedvigovskoye Rural Settlement of Myasnikovsky District
Vesyoly, Neklinovsky District, Rostov Oblast, a khutor in Polyakovskoye Rural Settlement of Neklinovsky District
Vesyoly, Oktyabrsky District, Rostov Oblast, a khutor in Krasnokutskoye Rural Settlement of Oktyabrsky District
Vesyoly, Orlovsky District, Rostov Oblast, a khutor in Ostrovyanskoye Rural Settlement of Orlovsky District
Vesyoly, Remontnensky District, Rostov Oblast, a khutor in Podgornenskoye Rural Settlement of Remontnensky District
Vesyoly, Rodionovo-Nesvetaysky District, Rostov Oblast, a khutor in Rodionovo-Nesvetayskoye Rural Settlement of Rodionovo-Nesvetaysky District
Vesyoly, Tselinsky District, Rostov Oblast, a khutor in Kirovskoye Rural Settlement of Tselinsky District
Vesyoly, Vesyolovsky District, Rostov Oblast, a settlement in Veselovskoye Rural Settlement of Vesyolovsky District

Ryazan Oblast
As of 2010, two rural localities in Ryazan Oblast bear this name:
Vesyoly, Sarayevsky District, Ryazan Oblast, a settlement in Mozharsky Rural Okrug of Sarayevsky District
Vesyoly, Shatsky District, Ryazan Oblast, a settlement in Starocherneyevsky Rural Okrug of Shatsky District

Stavropol Krai
As of 2010, seven rural localities in Stavropol Krai bear this name:
Vesyoly, Andropovsky District, Stavropol Krai, a khutor in Kurshavsky Selsoviet of Andropovsky District
Vesyoly, Dobrovolno-Vasilyevsky Selsoviet, Ipatovsky District, Stavropol Krai, a khutor in Dobrovolno-Vasilyevsky Selsoviet of Ipatovsky District
Vesyoly, Limansky Selsoviet, Ipatovsky District, Stavropol Krai, a khutor in Limansky Selsoviet of Ipatovsky District
Vesyoly, Kirovsky District, Stavropol Krai, a khutor in Gornozavodskoy Selsoviet of Kirovsky District
Vesyoly, Mineralovodsky District, Stavropol Krai, a khutor in Maryino-Kolodtsevsky Selsoviet of Mineralovodsky District
Vesyoly, Shpakovsky District, Stavropol Krai, a khutor in Temnolessky Selsoviet of Shpakovsky District
Vesyoloye, Stavropol Krai, a selo in Ivanovsky Selsoviet of Kochubeyevsky District

Tambov Oblast
As of 2010, one rural locality in Tambov Oblast bears this name:
Vesyoloye, Tambov Oblast, a selo in Veselovsky Selsoviet of Morshansky District

Tomsk Oblast
As of 2010, one rural locality in Tomsk Oblast bears this name:
Vesyoloye, Tomsk Oblast, a selo in Chainsky District

Tula Oblast
As of 2010, one rural locality in Tula Oblast bears this name:
Vesyoly, Tula Oblast, a settlement in Novopokrovskaya Rural Administration of Chernsky District

Tyumen Oblast
As of 2010, one rural locality in Tyumen Oblast bears this name:
Vesyoly, Tyumen Oblast, a settlement in Dubrovinsky Rural Okrug of Yarkovsky District

Volgograd Oblast
As of 2010, three rural localities in Volgograd Oblast bear this name:
Vesyoly, Kotelnikovsky District, Volgograd Oblast, a khutor in Verkhnekurmoyarsky Selsoviet of Kotelnikovsky District
Vesyoly, Mikhaylovsky District, Volgograd Oblast, a khutor in Oktyabrsky Selsoviet of Mikhaylovsky District
Vesyoly, Novoanninsky District, Volgograd Oblast, a khutor in Staroanninsky Selsoviet of Novoanninsky District

Vologda Oblast
As of 2010, three rural localities in Vologda Oblast bear this name:
Vesyolaya, Nizhneyenangsky Selsoviet, Kichmengsko-Gorodetsky District, Vologda Oblast, a village in Nizhneyenangsky Selsoviet of Kichmengsko-Gorodetsky District
Vesyolaya, Nizhneyentalsky Selsoviet, Kichmengsko-Gorodetsky District, Vologda Oblast, a village in Nizhneyentalsky Selsoviet of Kichmengsko-Gorodetsky District
Vesyolaya, Vashkinsky District, Vologda Oblast, a village in Roksomsky Selsoviet of Vashkinsky District

Voronezh Oblast
As of 2010, one rural locality in Voronezh Oblast bears this name:
Vesyoly, Voronezh Oblast, a khutor in Uryvskoye Rural Settlement of Ostrogozhsky District

See also
Vesyolovsky (disambiguation)
Vesele, Sudak Municipality, a village in Crimea